Brickellia argyrolepis is a Mesoamerican species of flowering plants in the family Asteraceae. It is native to Central America (all six Spanish-speaking countries) and to southern Mexico (Chiapas and Oaxaca).

References

External links
Photo taken in Nicaragua
Photo of herbarium specimen at Missouri Botanical Garden, collected in Costa Rica

argyrolepis
Flora of Mexico
Flora of Central America
Plants described in 1917